Nedeljko Vukoje (born September 9, 1943) is a Croatian-born Yugoslav retired football player.

Club career
As a player, he spent most of his career with HNK Rijeka, where he collected 143 caps and scored 32 goals. He was Rijeka's top scorer during the 1965-66 season. In July 1971 he moved to Germany, where he played for Freiburger FC.

International career
He has had one appearance for the Yugoslav national team (a friendly match against Bulgaria) in June 1966.

Honours
NK Rijeka
Yugoslav Second League: 1969-70

References

External links
 

1943 births
Living people
Footballers from Rijeka
Association football forwards
Yugoslav footballers
Yugoslavia international footballers
NK Opatija players
HNK Rijeka players
Freiburger FC players
Yugoslav First League
Yugoslav Second League
Regionalliga players
Yugoslav expatriate footballers
Expatriate footballers in West Germany
Yugoslav expatriate sportspeople in West Germany